para-Nitrophenylphosphate (pNPP) is a non-proteinaceous chromogenic substrate for alkaline and acid phosphatases used in ELISA and conventional spectrophotometric assays. Phosphatases catalyze the hydrolysis of pNPP liberating inorganic phosphate and the conjugate base of para-nitrophenol (pNP). The resulting phenolate is  yellow, with a maximal absorption at 405 nm. This property can be used to determine the activity of various phosphatases including alkaline phosphatase (AP) and protein tyrosine phosphatase (PTP).

The substance is sensitive to light, and thus should be stored protected from light. This is also important after adding the substrate to the mixture and before reading. −20 °C is the optimal storage temperature.

References

External links
 pNPP disodium salt hexahydrate (SigmaAldrich.com)
 Nunc Brand Products

Organophosphates
Nitrobenzenes
Phenol esters